The Arms of Canada, also known as the Royal Coat of Arms of Canada or, formally, as the Arms of His Majesty the King in Right of Canada, is, since 1921, the arms of dominion of the Canadian monarch and, thus, also the official coat of arms of Canada. It is closely modelled after the royal coat of arms of the United Kingdom, with French and distinctive Canadian elements replacing or added to those derived from the British version.

The maple leaves in the shield, blazoned "proper" (i.e. in natural colour), were originally drawn vert (green), but were redrawn gules (red) in 1957 and a circlet of the Order of Canada was added to the arms for limited use in 1987. The arms are registered with the Canadian Heraldic Authority and protected under Crown copyright; they are used to signify national sovereignty and the federal government uses the arms to represent the state under the Federal Identity Program. Elements of the coat of arms are also used in other designs, with the shield design being used in the various royal standards belonging to members of the royal family and the governor general's flag, featuring the crest of the arms on a blue field.

History

Prior to Confederation in 1867, the royal coat of arms of the United Kingdom served in Canada as the symbol of royal authority. Arms had not been granted to any of the colonies in British North America, apart from 17th century grants to Nova Scotia and Newfoundland. Arms were then granted by royal warrant, on 26 May 1868, to Ontario, Quebec, Nova Scotia, (that Nova Scotia had been granted arms was forgotten, and it took until 1929 for the historic arms granted in the 17th century to be reinstated) and New Brunswick. In that warrant, Queen Victoria authorized the four arms of the first provinces to be quartered for use on the Great Seal of Canada. While this was not done for the first Great Seal, it was through that reference that the arrangement became the de facto arms for Canada until 1921, which were used on the first Red Ensign carried by Canadian troops at Vimy Ridge in 1917.

As more provinces and territories joined Canada, the original four arms were marshalled with the arms of the new members of Confederation, eventually resulting in a shield with nine quarterings. This occurred by way of popular and even Canadian governmental usage; flag-makers took to using the complex shield on Canadian Red Ensigns. None of those shields, besides the original four-segment version of 1868, were ever official in any sense, nor were any of these shields a national "coat of arms", as they had never been approved by the monarch.

Heraldists considered nine quarterings on a shield as too convoluted for a national symbol and, by 1915, a push had begun to design a new coat of arms for Canada. A committee was formed in 1919 to pursue the issue, eventually agreeing that the elements of the new arms would reference the royal arms of England, Ireland, Scotland, and France, with maple leaves representing Canada, though there was at the time no consensus on how the leaves were to be used. The decision was settled by the following year and the committee conferred with the College of Arms in London, only to face resistance to the use of the UK's royal arms from the Garter King of Arms.

After some manoeuvring, including the personal intervention of Winston Churchill, the new arms of Canada were eventually formally requested by an order-in-council on 30 April 1921 and adopted on 21 November of the same year, by proclamation of King George V, as the Arms or Ensigns Armorial of the Dominion of Canada. The new layout closely reflected the arms of the United Kingdom, with the addition of maple leaves in the base and the reference to the French royal arms in the fourth quarter. The proclamation also established white and red as the national colours of Canada.

With the passage of the Statute of Westminster in 1931, Canada and other Dominions became fully sovereign from the United Kingdom. This had the effect of elevating the Canadian coat of arms, which had been granted as deputed arms for particular uses in a colony, to the status of the royal arms of the King in right of the country, for general purposes throughout the country. They thus replaced the British coat of arms, which had previously been arms of general purpose throughout the British Empire, in courtrooms and on government buildings to represent the reigning monarch. This change can be seen in the Great Seal of Canada of King George VI, where the royal arms of Canada replaced the British arms, and is even more evident in the Great Seal of Canada for Queen Elizabeth II, on which the title Queen of Canada is used.

By 1957, the arms were redrawn by Alan Beddoe so as to have red leaves and to change the royal crown from a Tudor design to one more resembling St Edward's Crown, as preferred by Queen Elizabeth II. To mark the 1982 patriation of the Canadian constitution, which finally ended the last vestiges of the British parliament's role in amending the constitution, a McGill University student named Bruce Hicks proposed to Secretary of State Gerald Regan that the motto of the Order of Canada—at the time, the country's highest civilian honour for merit—be placed around the shield in order to bring these royal arms into line with other royal arms displayed in Canada—holdovers from the time of French, Scottish, and English colonisation—on which a symbol of those countries' highest national order of honour appeared around the shield (the British arms displayed the Order of the Garter, the Scottish royal arms the Order of the Thistle, and the royalist arms of the French Regime the Order of the Holy Spirit and Order of Saint Michael). While unsuccessful in this first attempt, Hicks continued his campaign and was joined by a number of other amateur and professional heraldists. As a journalist in the parliamentary press gallery in Ottawa in the late 1980s and early '90s, Hicks strategically recast the change as something worth doing to commemorate the 25th anniversary of the Order of Canada's founding, in 1992; an idea that was endorsed by the Advisory Committee on the Order of Canada.

It took until 1994 for the Queen to approve the new design for general use; though, the Canadian Heraldic Authority, established by the Queen in 1988, began to allow for its limited use beginning in 1987, where the arms were used to represent the Queen personally on letters patent granting new arms for distinguished Canadians. These letters patent carried the shield from the royal arms along with the annulus behind the shield bearing the motto of the Order of Canada—Desiderantes meliorem patriam. As soon as royal approval was forthcoming, the full achievement was redesigned for use by the federal government within the Federal Identity Program. The present design of the arms of Canada was drawn by Cathy Bursey-Sabourin, Fraser Herald at the Canadian Heraldic Authority.

Member of Parliament Pat Martin introduced, in June 2008, a motion into the House of Commons calling on the government to amend the coat of arms to incorporate symbols representing Canada's First Nations, Inuit, and Métis peoples.

Armorial evolution

Use

The coat of arms, being those of the sovereign and the state, is used to signify national sovereignty and ownership. The federal government uses the arms to represent the state under the Federal Identity Program and as a mark of authority for various government agencies and representatives, including Cabinet, and the prime minister within it, and the Supreme Court, as well as the Canadian Armed Forces and Royal Canadian Mounted Police (RCMP). In the latter two, the most senior non-commissioned ranks wear the 1957 version of the arms as a badge of rank, representing the fact that they have received the King's warrant (as opposed to the King's Commission for officers).

The arms of Canada is also present on all pre-polymer denominations of Canadian banknotes—printed on each bill in a way that functions as a security feature,—as well as the 50¢ coin and on the cover of Canadian passports. Permanent resident cards issued from 2015 feature a holographic representation of the 1957 version of the coat of arms.

The full achievement of the coat of arms has been used by the Canadian government on occasion on a plain red flag, such as in 1967 for the country's centennial celebrations. It is also used on a flag in its full achievement in military ceremonies, such as Canadian Armed Forces Tattoo performances.

As the royal arms are personal to the sovereign, they cannot be used without the King's consent. The coat of arms "as designed in 1921 and revised in 1957 [...] [and] in 1994" are "protected under the Trade-marks Act and the Copyright Act and cannot be used or reproduced without authorization." Further, "marks and designs similar to the official symbols are pursued as a copyright or trade-mark infringement." The Trade-marks Act further states that, "no person shall adopt in connection with a business, as a trade-mark or otherwise, any mark consisting of, or so nearly resembling as to be likely to be mistaken for [...] the arms, crest, or flag adopted and used at any time by Canada." In addition, under Crown copyright, "permission is always required when the work is being revised, adapted, or translated, regardless if the purpose of the reproduction is for personal or public non-commercial distribution."

Designs derived from the arms
Since 1962, a banner of the arms, defaced with a variant of the Queen's cypher, has formed the sovereign's standard for Canada, for use by the Queen in her capacity as monarch of Canada. Since, six additional standards for use by other members of the Canadian Royal Family were created in the 2010s.

The personal flag of the Governor General has, since 1981, features the crest of the royal arms of Canada on a blue background.

In response to a new campaign by Bruce Hicks for the Canadian Parliament to have a distinct heraldic symbol along the lines of the portcullis (variations of which are used by the Commons and Lords in the British Parliament), a proposal that was supported by Speakers of the House of Commons John Fraser and Gilbert Parent, a Commons committee was eventually struck following a motion by MP Derek Lee, before which Hicks and Robert Watt, the first Chief Herald of Canada, was called as the only two expert witnesses, though Senator Serge Joyal joined the committee ex-officio on behalf of the Senate.  Commons' Speaker Peter Milliken then asked the Canadian Heraldic Authority to authorize such a symbol and, on 15 February 2008, the Governor General authorized the House of Commons to begin using a badge of the shield of the royal arms superimposed on the ceremonial mace assigned to the House of Commons as a symbol of the royal authority under which it operates. Following the Commons example, the Senate then requested and obtained on 15 April 2008 a similar badge for itself with the shield of the royal arms surmounted on the mace assigned to the Senate.

Blazon
The heraldic blazon of Canada's coat of arms, as declared in the 1921 proclamation, is:

Tierced in fesse the first and second divisions containing the quarterly coat following, namely, 1st, gules three lions passant guardant in pale Or, 2nd, Or a lion rampant within a double tressure flory-counter-flory gules, 3rd, azure a harp Or stringed argent, 4th, azure, three fleurs-de-lis Or, and the third division argent three maple leaves conjoined on one stem proper. And upon a royal helmet mantled argent doubled gules the crest, that is to say, on a wreath of the colours argent and gules a lion passant guardant Or imperially crowned proper and holding in the dexter paw a maple leaf gules. And for supporters on the dexter a lion rampant Or holding a lance argent, point Or, flying therefrom to the dexter the Union Flag, and on the sinister, a unicorn argent armed crined and unguled Or, gorged with a coronet composed of crosses-patée and fleurs-de-lis a chain affixed thereto reflexed of the last, and holding a like lance flying therefrom to the sinister a banner azure charged with three fleurs-de-lis Or; the whole ensigned with the Imperial Crown proper and below the shield upon a wreath composed of roses, thistles, shamrocks and lillies a scroll azure inscribed with the motto A mari usque ad mare.

The circlet of the Order of Canada was added around the shield for limited use in 1987, and for general use in 1994.

Symbolism

See also

References

External links

Registration of the Arms and Supporters of Her Majesty The Queen in Right of Canada
Arms & Badges – Royal Arms of Canada, A Brief History

 
Canada
Monarchy in Canada
Canadian heraldry
Canada
Canada
Canada
Canada
Canada
Canada
Canada
Canada
Canada
Canada
Canada